Library and information science(s) or studies (LIS) is an interdisciplinary field of study that deals generally with organization, access, collection, and protection/regulation of information, whether in physical (e.g. art, legal proceedings, etc.) or digital forms. 

In spite of various trends to merge the two fields, some consider the two original disciplines, library science and information science, to be separate. However, it is common today to use the terms synonymously or to drop the term "library" and to speak about information departments or I-schools. There have also been attempts to revive the concept of documentation and to speak of Library, information and documentation studies (or science).

History 
By the late 1960s, mainly due to the meteoric rise of human computing power and the new academic disciplines formed therefrom, academic institutions began to add the term "information science" to their names. The first school to do this was at the University of Pittsburgh in 1964. More schools followed during the 1970s and 1980s, and by the 1990s almost all library schools in the USA had added information science to their names. Although there are exceptions, similar developments have taken place in other parts of the world. In Denmark, for example, the 'Royal School of Librarianship' changed its English name to The Royal School of Library and Information Science in 1997.

Relations between library science, information science and LIS
Tefko Saracevic (1992, p. 13) argued that library science and information science are separate fields:

Another indication of the different uses of the two terms are the indexing in UMI's Dissertations Abstracts. In Dissertations Abstracts Online in November 2011 were 4888 dissertations indexed with the descriptor LIBRARY SCIENCE and 9053 with the descriptor INFORMATION SCIENCE. For the year 2009 the numbers were 104 LIBRARY SCIENCE and 514 INFORMATION SCIENCE. 891 dissertations were indexed with both terms (36 in 2009).

It should be considered that information science grew out of documentation science and therefore has a tradition for considering scientific and scholarly communication, bibliographic databases, subject knowledge and terminology etc. Library science, on the other hand has mostly concentrated on libraries and their internal processes and best practices. It is also relevant to consider that information science used to be done by scientists, while librarianship has been split between public libraries and scholarly research libraries. Library schools have mainly educated librarians for public libraries and not shown much interest in scientific communication and documentation. When information scientists from 1964 entered library schools, they brought with them competencies in relation to information retrieval in subject databases, including concepts such as recall and precision, boolean search techniques, query formulation and related issues. Subject bibliographic databases and citation indexes provided a major step forward in information dissemination - and also in the curriculum at library schools.

Julian Warner (2010) suggests that the information and computer science tradition in information retrieval may broadly be characterized as query transformation, with the query articulated verbally by the user in advance of searching and then transformed by a system into a set of records. From librarianship and indexing, on the other hand, has been an implicit stress on selection power enabling the user to make relevant selections.

Difficulties defining LIS
"The question, 'What is library and information science?' does not elicit responses of the same internal conceptual coherence as similar inquiries as to the nature of other fields, e.g., 'What is chemistry?', 'What is economics?', 'What is medicine?' Each of those fields, though broad in scope, has clear ties to basic concerns of their field. [...] Neither LIS theory nor practice is perceived to be monolithic nor unified by a common literature or set of professional skills. Occasionally, LIS scholars (many of whom do not self-identify as members of an interreading LIS community, or prefer names other than LIS), attempt, but are unable, to find core concepts in common. Some believe that computing and internetworking concepts and skills underlie virtually every important aspect of LIS, indeed see LIS as a sub-field of computer science! [Footnote III.1] Others claim that LIS is principally a social science accompanied by practical skills such as ethnography and interviewing. Historically, traditions of public service, bibliography, documentalism, and information science have viewed their mission, their philosophical toolsets, and their domain of research differently. Still others deny the existence of a greater metropolitan LIS, viewing LIS instead as a loosely organized collection of specialized interests often unified by nothing more than their shared (and fought-over) use of the descriptor information. Indeed, claims occasionally arise to the effect that the field even has no theory of its own." (Konrad, 2007, p. 652–653).

A multidisciplinary, interdisciplinary or monodisciplinary field? 
The Swedish researcher Emin Tengström (1993) described cross-disciplinary research as a process, not a state or structure. He differentiates three levels of ambition regarding cross-disciplinary research:
 The "Pluridisciplinary" or "multidisciplinarity" level
 The genuine cross-disciplinary level: "interdisciplinarity"
 The discipline-forming level "transdisciplinarity"

What is described here is a view of social fields as dynamic and changing. Library and information science is viewed as a field that started as a multidisciplinary field based on literature, psychology, sociology, management, computer science etc., which is developing towards an academic discipline in its own right. However, the following quote seems to indicate that LIS is actually developing in the opposite direction:

Chua & Yang (2008) studied papers published in Journal of the American Society for Information Science and Technology in the period 1988–1997 and found, among other things: "Top authors have grown in diversity from those being affiliated predominantly with library/information-related departments to include those from information systems management, information technology, business, and the humanities. Amid heterogeneous clusters of collaboration among top authors, strongly connected crossdisciplinary
coauthor pairs have become more prevalent. Correspondingly, the distribution of top keywords’ occurrences that leans heavily on core information science has shifted towards other subdisciplines such as information technology and sociobehavioral science."

A more recent study revealed that 31% of the papers published in 31 LIS journals from 2007 through 2012 were by authors in academic departments of library and information science (i.e., those offering degree programs accredited by the American Library Association or similar professional organizations in other countries).  Faculty in departments of computer science (10%), management (10%), communication (3%), the other social sciences (9%), and the other natural sciences (7%) were also represented.  Nearly one-quarter of the papers in the 31 journals were by practicing librarians, and 6% were by others in non-academic (e.g., corporate) positions.

As a field with its own body of interrelated concepts, techniques, journals, and professional associations, LIS is clearly a discipline. But by the nature of its subject matter and methods LIS is just as clearly an interdiscipline, drawing on many adjacent fields (see below).

A fragmented adhocracy 
Richard Whitley (1984, 2000) classified scientific fields according to their intellectual and social organization and described management studies as a 'fragmented adhocracy', a field with a low level of coordination around a diffuse set of goals and a non-specialized terminology; but with strong connections to the practice in the business sector. Åström (2006) applied this conception to the description of LIS.

Scattering of the literature 
Meho & Spurgin (2005) found that in a list of 2,625 items published between 1982 and 2002 by 68 faculty members of 18 schools of library and information science, only 10 databases provided significant coverage of the LIS literature. Results also show that restricting the data sources to one, two, or even three databases leads to inaccurate rankings and erroneous conclusions. Because no database provides comprehensive coverage of the LIS literature, researchers must rely on a wide range of disciplinary and multidisciplinary databases for ranking and other research purposes. Even when the nine most comprehensive databases in LIS was searched and combined, 27.0% (or 710 of 2,635) of the publications remain not found.

The unique concern of library and information science
"Concern for people becoming informed is not unique to LIS, and thus is insufficient to differentiate LIS from other fields. LIS are a part of a larger enterprise." (Konrad, 2007, p. 655).

"The unique concern of LIS is recognized as: Statement of the core concern of LIS:
Humans becoming informed (constructing meaning) via intermediation between inquirers and instrumented records. No other field has this as its concern. " (Konrad, 2007, p. 660)

"Note that the promiscuous term information does not appear in the above statement circumscribing the field's central concerns: The detrimental effects of the ambiguity this term provokes are discussed above (Part III). Furner [Furner 2004, 427] has shown that discourse in the field is improved where specific terms are utilized in place of the i-word for specific senses of that term." (Konrad, 2007, p. 661).

Michael Buckland wrote: "Educational programs in library, information and documentation are concerned with what people know, are not limited to technology, and require wide-ranging expertise. They differ fundamentally and importantly from computer science programs and from the information systems programs found in business schools.".

Bawden and Robinson argue that while Information Science has overlaps with numerous other disciplines with interest in studying communication, it is unique in that it is concerned with all aspects of the communication chain.  For example, Computer Science may be interested in the indexing and retrieval, sociology with user studies, and publishing (business) with dissemination, whereas information science is interested in the study of all of these individual areas and the interactions between them.

The organization of information and information resources is one of the fundamental aspects of LIS. and is an example of both LIS's uniqueness and its multidisciplinary origins.  Some of the main tools used by LIS toward this end to provide access to the digital resources of modern times (particularly theory relating to indexing and classification) originated in 19th century to assist humanity's effort to make its intellectual output accessible by recording, identifying, and providing bibliographic control of printed knowledge.  The origin for some of these tools were even earlier. For example, in the 17th century, during the 'golden age of libraries', publishers and sellers seeking to take advantage of the burgeoning book trade developed descriptive catalogs of their wares for distribution – a practice was adopted and further extrapolated by many libraries of the time to cover areas like philosophy, sciences, linguistics, medicine, etc.   In this way, a business concern of publishers – keeping track of and advertising inventory – was developed into a system for organizing and preserving information by the library.

The development of Metadata is another area that exemplifies the aim of LIS to be something more than an mishmash of several disciplines – that uniqueness Bawden and Robinson describe.  Pre-Internet classification systems and cataloging systems were mainly concerned with two objectives: 1. to provide rich bibliographic descriptions and relations between information objects and 2. to facilitate sharing of this bibliographic information across library boundaries.    The development of the Internet and the information explosion that followed found many communities needing mechanisms for the description, authentication and management of their information.  These communities developed taxonomies and controlled vocabularies to describe their knowledge as well as unique information architectures to communicate these classifications and libraries found themselves as liaison or translator between these metadata systems.  Of course the concerns of cataloging in the Internet era have gone beyond simple bibliographic descriptions.  The need for descriptive information about the ownership and copyright of a digital product – a publishing concern – and description for the different formats and accessibility features of a resource – a sociological concern – show the continued development and cross discipline necessity of resource description.

In the 21st century, the usage of open data, open source and open protocols like OAI-PMH has allowed thousands of libraries and institutions to collaborate on the production of global metadata services previously offered only by increasingly expensive commercial proprietary products. Examples include BASE and Unpaywall, which automates the search of an academic paper across thousands of repositories by libraries and research institutions.

Christopher M. Owusu-Ansah argued that, Many African universities have employed distance education to expand access to education and digital libraries can ensure seamless access to information for distance learners.

LIS theories
Julian Warner (2010, p. 4–5) suggests that

Among other approaches, Evidence Based Library and Information Practice should also be mentioned.

Journals
(see also List of LIS Journals in India page,  :Category:Library science journals and Journal Citation Reports for listing according to Impact factor)

Some core journals in LIS are:

 Annual Review of Information Science and Technology (ARIST) (1966–2011)
 El Profesional de la Información (es) (EPI) (1992–) (Formerly Information World en Español) 
 Information Processing and Management
 Information Research: An International Electronic Journal (IR) (1995–)
 Italian Journal of Library and Information Studies (JLIS.it)
 Journal of Documentation (JDoc) (1945–)
 Journal of Information Science (JIS) (1979–)
 Journal of the Association for Information Science and Technology (Formerly Journal of the American Society for Information Science and Technology) (JASIST) (1950–)
 Knowledge Organization (journal)
 Library Literature and Information Science Retrospective
 Library Trends (1952–)
 Scientometrics (journal) (1978–)
 The Library Quarterly  (LQ) (1931–)
 Grandhalaya Sarvaswam (1915–)

Important bibliographical databases in LIS are, among others, Social Sciences Citation Index and Library and Information Science Abstracts

Conferences
This is a list of some of the major conferences in the field.

Annual meeting of the American Society for Information Science and Technology
 Conceptions of Library and Information Science
 i-Schools' iConferences
 The International Federation of Library Associations and Institutions (IFLA): World Library and Information Congress
 African Library and Information Associations and Institutions (AfLIA) Conference

Common subfields

An advertisement for a full Professor in information science at the Royal School of Library and Information Science, spring 2011, provides one view of which subdisciplines are well-established: "The research and teaching/supervision must be within some (and at least one) of these well-established information science areas
 a.	Knowledge organization
 b.	Library studies
 c.	Information architecture
 d.	Information behavior
 e.	Interactive information retrieval
 f.	Information systems
 g.	Scholarly communication
 h.	Digital literacy (cf information literacy)
 i.	Bibliometrics or scientometrics
 j.	Interaction design and user experience"
 k. Digital library

There are other ways to identify subfields within LIS, for example bibliometric mapping and comparative studies of curricula.
Bibliometric maps of LIS have been produced by, among others, Vickery & Vickery (1987, frontispiece), White & McCain (1998), Åström (2002), 2006) and Hassan-Montero & Herrero-Solana (2007). 
An example of a curriculum study is Kajberg & Lørring, 2005. In this publication are the following data reported (p 234):
"Degree of overlap of the ten curricular themes with subject areas in the current curricula of responding LIS schools
 Information seeking and Information retrieval 100%
 Library management and promotion 96%
 Knowledge management 86%
 Knowledge organization 82%
 Information literacy and learning 76%
 Library and society in a historical perspective (Library history) 66%
  The Information society: Barriers to the free access to information 64%
 Cultural heritage and digitisation of the cultural heritage (Digital preservation) 62%
 The library in the multi-cultural information society: International and intercultural communication 42%
 Mediation of culture in a special European context 26% "

There is often an overlap between these subfields of LIS and other fields of study. Most information retrieval research, for example, belongs to computer science. Knowledge management is considered a subfield of management or organizational studies.

See also

 Archival science
 Authority control
 Bibliography
 Digital Asset Management (DAM)
 Documentation science
 Education for librarianship
 Glossary of library and information science
 I-school
 Information history
 Information systems
 Knowledge management
 Library and information scientist
 Metadata
 Museology
 Museum informatics
 Records Management

References

Further reading

 
 
 
 
 

 

hu:Könyvtár- és információtudomány
sv:Biblioteks- och informationsvetenskap